Ivan Sotirov (born 14 March 1935 in Plovdiv) is a former Bulgarian footballer who played as a forward.

Career
Sotirov began his career at Spartak Plovdiv, where he played one season, before joining Botev Plovdiv. Between 1955 and 1965 Sotirov played 228 matches for Botev, scoring 86 goals. He was the A Group top scorer in the 1960–61 season with 20 goals.

Honours

Club
Botev Plovdiv
 Bulgarian Cup: 1962

References

External links
Player Profile at botevplovdiv.bg

1935 births
Living people
Bulgarian footballers
First Professional Football League (Bulgaria) players
FC Spartak Plovdiv players
Botev Plovdiv players

Association football forwards